Tony Gallopin (born 24 May 1988) is a French professional road racing cyclist, who currently rides for UCI WorldTeam .

Career
Born in Dourdan, Île-de-France, Gallopin currently resides in Angerville.

After two seasons with the  squad, Gallopin joined the  team for the 2014 season.

On 13 July 2014 Gallopin escaped in a breakaway on Stage 9 of the Tour de France, gaining almost 8 minutes on the leader Vincenzo Nibali to take the yellow jersey. Three days later, on Stage 11, Gallopin escaped from the main peloton on the final descent into Oyonnax to win the stage, just in front of the chasing pack.

He won stage 7 of the 2018 Vuelta a España after attacking inside the last 3 kilometers. In May 2019, he was named in the startlist for the 2019 Giro d'Italia.

Personal life
Gallopin married fellow racing cyclist and former French national road racing champion Marion Rousse on 18 October 2014. In February 2020, Rousse announced via an Instagram post that the couple had separated.

Major results
Source: 

2005
 2nd Chrono des Nations Juniors
2006
 1st Chrono des Nations Juniors
 2nd Time trial, National Junior Road Championships
 UCI Junior World Championships
3rd  Road race
3rd  Time trial
 7th Road race, UEC European Junior Road Championships
2007
 2nd Time trial, National Under-23 Road Championships
 4th Chrono Champenois
 9th Overall Tour du Haut-Anjou
2008
 1st Paris–Tours Espoirs
 3rd Overall Thüringen Rundfahrt der U23
 7th Time trial, UEC European Under-23 Road Championships
2009
 4th Paris–Mantes-en-Yvelines
 7th Overall Tour du Poitou-Charentes
 8th Grand Prix Cristal Energie
2010
 1st Stage 3 Tour de Luxembourg
 6th Overall Boucles de la Mayenne
 10th Overall Tour de l'Ain
2011
 1st Overall French Road Cycling Cup
 1st Flèche d'Emeraude
 2nd Cholet-Pays de Loire
 3rd Overall Tour de Luxembourg
 4th Overall Tour du Limousin
1st Stage 2
 6th Polynormande
 6th Grand Prix de Plumelec-Morbihan
 6th Trofeo Magaluf-Palmanova
 8th Châteauroux Classic
 9th Tour du Doubs
 9th Trofeo Palma de Mallorca
 10th Route Adélie
 10th Trofeo Inca
2012
 3rd Overall Tour of Oman
1st  Young rider classification
 6th Overall Bayern Rundfahrt
1st  Young rider classification
 10th Grand Prix Cycliste de Montréal
2013
 1st Clásica de San Sebastián
 3rd Road race, National Road Championships
 4th Overall Circuit de la Sarthe
2014
 Tour de France
1st Stage 11
Held  after Stage 9
 2nd Grand Prix de Wallonie
 3rd Brabantse Pijl
 3rd Grand Prix Cycliste de Montréal
 5th Clásica de San Sebastián
 6th Road race, UCI Road World Championships
 6th E3 Harelbeke
 7th Overall Étoile de Bessèges
 9th Grand Prix Cycliste de Québec
 10th Overall Paris–Nice
2015
 2nd Road race, National Road Championships
 2nd Overall Étoile de Bessèges
1st Stage 4
 4th International Road Cycling Challenge
 4th Brabantse Pijl
 6th Overall Paris–Nice
1st Stage 6
 6th Amstel Gold Race
 7th Road race, UCI Road World Championships
 7th Giro di Lombardia
 8th Grand Prix Cycliste de Québec
 9th Milan–San Remo
2016
 1st Grand Prix de Wallonie
 National Road Championships
2nd Road race
3rd Time trial
 2nd Overall Étoile de Bessèges
 2nd Clásica de San Sebastián
 3rd Brabantse Pijl
 4th Overall Tour of Britain
 6th Overall Volta ao Algarve
 7th Road race, UEC European Road Championships
 8th Overall Paris–Nice
 8th Grand Prix d'Ouverture La Marseillaise
2017
 2nd Overall Étoile de Bessèges
1st Stage 5 (ITT)
 2nd Clásica de San Sebastián
 2nd Grand Prix de Wallonie
 3rd Overall Volta ao Algarve
 5th Grand Prix d'Ouverture La Marseillaise
 6th Grand Prix Cycliste de Montréal
 9th Grand Prix Cycliste de Québec
 10th Overall Paris–Nice
 10th Overall Tour of Norway
2018
 1st  Overall Étoile de Bessèges
1st Stage 5 (ITT)
 1st Stage 7 Vuelta a España
 2nd Time trial, National Road Championships
 2nd Overall Tour La Provence
 9th Grand Prix d'Ouverture La Marseillaise
2019
 2nd Overall Tour Poitou-Charentes en Nouvelle-Aquitaine
 3rd Overall Tour de la Provence
 4th Overall Route d'Occitanie
 9th Grand Prix de Wallonie
 9th Mont Ventoux Dénivelé Challenge
2021
 1st  Sprints classification, UAE Tour
2022
 7th GP Industria & Artigianato di Larciano
 10th Binche–Chimay–Binche

General classification results timeline

References

External links

 
 
 
 

1988 births
Cyclists at the 2012 Summer Olympics
French male cyclists
Living people
Olympic cyclists of France
People from Dourdan
2014 Tour de France stage winners
French Tour de France stage winners
French Vuelta a España stage winners
Sportspeople from Essonne
Mediterranean Games silver medalists for France
Mediterranean Games medalists in cycling
Competitors at the 2009 Mediterranean Games
Cyclists from Île-de-France
21st-century French people